Nevestino may refer to several villages in Bulgaria:

 Nevestino, Burgas Province
 Nevestino, Kardzhali Province
 Nevestino, Kyustendil Province – the administrative centre of Nevestino municipality

See also
 Nevestino Cove, Antarctica, named after such villages